Bergen Nordhordland Rutelag is a Norwegian company based in Vestland. The company operates a small fleet of ferries.

History
BNR It has roots back to 1880 when Lindaas-Masfjorden Dampskibsselskap was created. The company was founded in 1974 when Bergen-Nordhordland Trafikklag, Indre Nordhordland Dampbåtlag and Arna-Osterøy Billag merged. The company had permission to operate bus transport in Meland, Lindås, Radøy, Austrheim, Fedje, Masfjorden og Osterøy. The company also operated car ferries and owned the ferry company Fjord Line. The company was bought by Hardanger Sunnhordlandske Dampskipsselskap as of January 2002 while Fjord Line still is independent. In 2006 HSD merged with Gaia Trafikk forming the new company Tide.

In 2004 BNR were established again as a fast ferry company, and are operating 6 fast ferries in the Bergen region and in Sogn and Fjordane (Flåm - Gudvangen and Flåm - Sogndal).

Fleet
The new BNR fleet consists of 6 express boats and 2 car ferries.
MS "Fjord Express", Monohull express boat
MS "Hardangerprins", Catamaran
MS "Sogneprins", Catamaran
MS "Snarveien", Catamaran
MS "Sea Express", Monohull express boat
MS "Prinsessen", Catamaran
MF "Sundferja", Car ferry
MF "Fjordbas", Car ferry

References

Shipping companies of Norway
Defunct bus companies of Norway
Bus companies of Vestland
Ferry companies of Vestland
Transport in Bergen
Lindås
Transport companies established in 1974
Norwegian companies established in 1974